Valentino Borgia (8 November 1914 – 29 August 2004) was an Italian wrestler. He competed in the men's Greco-Roman featherweight at the 1936 Summer Olympics.

References

External links
 

1914 births
2004 deaths
Italian male sport wrestlers
Olympic wrestlers of Italy
Wrestlers at the 1936 Summer Olympics
Sportspeople from Bologna
20th-century Italian people